Color analysis (American English; colour analysis in Commonwealth English), also known as personal color analysis (PCA), seasonal color analysis, or skin-tone matching, is a term often used within the cosmetics and fashion industry to describe a method of determining the colors of clothing, makeup, hair style that harmonizes with a person's skin complexion, eye color, and hair color for use in wardrobe planning and style consulting. It is generally agreed that the wrong colors will draw attention to such flaws as wrinkles or uneven skin tone while harmonious colors will enhance the natural beauty of the individual making them appear healthy, brighter, and possible more attactive or put-together. 

By the 1920s, a color revolution had occurred in the United States with the development of new color industries and the possibility of producing color swatch books used as a marketing tool. Personal color analysis reached a height in popularity in the early 1980s with a recent resurgence in the 2010s after further development and promotion of different versions of seasonal analysis by image and color consultants worldwide. Seasonal analysis is a technique that attempts to place individual coloring into the tonal groupings of Winter, Spring, Summer and Autumn, and their sub-variants. However, the approach can vary greatly among different schools of thought. Some color analysis systems classify an individual's personal combination of hair color, eye color and skin tone using labels that refer to a color's "temperature" (cool blue vs. warm yellow) and the degree to which the hair, skin and eye colors contrast. Cosmetic colors are often determined by hair or eye color alone.

The successful practical application of a color analysis will theoretically allow the individual to coordinate his or her clothing and accessories with greater ease and avoid costly mistakes by purchasing items that are not within their color palette. However, color analysis has continued to be controversial due to the lack of standard training or degree required to market oneself as a color analyst. This can become costly for the individual, both in regard to the fees of professional and less than professional analyses, and subsequent clothing and cosmetics purchases.

History

Early history (1850s–early 1970s)

Chevreul

Michel Eugène Chevreul (1786–1889) was a French chemist whose career took a new direction in 1824 when he was appointed director of dyeing at the Gobelins Manufactory in Paris, where he worked for 28 years. After receiving several complaints about the lack of consistency in the dye colors, Chevreul determined that the issue was not chemical but optical and focused his attention on exploring optical color mixing. He published his groundbreaking findings in The Laws of Contrast of Colour (1839) where he discussed the concept of simultaneous contrast (the colors of two different objects affect each other), successive contrast (a negative afterimage effect), and mixed contrast.

Chevreul's studies in color became the most widely used and influential color manual of the 19th century with a significant and long-lasting impact on the fine and industrial arts. As well as being the first to create a hemispherical color model displaying 72 normal tone hue scales, his exploration of color harmonies is an underlying principle in personal color analysis. In the 1850s, Chevreul's ideas were prescribed for an American audience lacking any education in color harmony. Godey's Lady's Book (1855 and 1859) introduced "gaudy" American women to Chevreul's idea of "becoming colors" for brunettes and blondes.

Munsell
Albert Henry Munsell (1858–1918) is famous for inventing the Munsell color system, one of the first color order systems created. An American painter and art teacher at the Massachusetts Normal Art School, he had visited the tapestry works of Chevreul and studied color in France. With the use of his own unique inventions, including the Photometer that measures object luminance, Munsell started to determine color spaces and standardize the way color was organized and defined.

In 1905, Munsell published his first of three books on color, A Color Notation where he discussed his color theory referencing three color dimensions: hue (the discernible shade on the wavelength spectrum), value (lightness to darkness scale), and chroma (softness through to brightness). Before the Munsell Color Theory, the intensity of color was defined as 'saturation' in the art and scientific community. Munsell determined that saturation encompassed two different dimensions, value and chroma, where chroma defines the difference between a pure hue and a pure grey.

Munsell paid close attention to the human visual system and human response to color, being sensitive to its inclusion in his mapping of three-dimensional color space. In 1917, Munsell founded the Munsell Color Company, to improve color communication and education. In the 1930s, the Munsell Color System was adopted by the USDA as the official color system for soil research and the system. The company is now owned by X-Rite who is known for color calibration. The Munsell Color System still remains the basis of color education today and is the foundation for modern color systems including CIELAB.

Itten
Johannes Itten (1888–1967) was a Swiss-born artist and art educator who expounded upon the principles of simultaneous contrast which Chevreul set forth in his 1839 treatise. He valued individual artistic expression and in 1928, while teaching a class assignment on color harmony, he noticed his students were choosing colors, lines and orientation that showed themselves "as they are", which led him to formulate the concept of "subjective color".

In his 1961 book The Art of Color, Itten examined two different approaches to understanding the art of color: Subjective feelings and objective color principles. Itten described "subjective color" as "the aura of the person. and provided examples or how subjective color might be expressed by an artist: A high contrast brunette will choose dark colors and high contrast, "suggesting a lively and concentrated personality and intense feeling." On the other hand, for a fair woman of low contrast the "fundamental contrast is hue". Furthermore, Itten linked these subjective colors to the four seasons of Spring, Summer, Autumn, and Winter, which became the foundation for seasonal color analysis. In his book, Itten noted that, "Every woman should know what colors are becoming to her; they will always be her subjective colors and their complements."

Itten believed that "subjective colors" were of a lower artistic value and significance than what he deemed "objective colors," which were color harmonies of a higher order. In his final chapter titled 'Composition', Itten spoke of bringing two or more colors together in such a way that they harmonize to give an expression unambiguous and full of character.

Dorr
Robert C. Dorr (1905–1979) was an American artist who, in 1928, observed the harmonious effects of paint colors when grouping those of either a blue or yellow undertone. In 1934 Chicago, Dorr began working on furniture design using his own color theory of undertones and developed his ideas on color psychology. After working on a textile group for a manufacturer, he became a professional color consultant for cosmetic companies.

Dorr's Color Key System defined an individual's complexion as being either Key I (cool blue undertone) or Key II (warm yellow undertone). Each palette in The Color Key Program contain 170 colors per fan. Orange and magenta are the color indicants of yellow and blue undertones respectively. Dorr's Color Key Program took all races into consideration and no race was limited to any one Key palette.

After moving to California in the late 1950s, Dorr taught courses and gave lectures on his Color Key Program until his death in 1979. The color company Devoe Reynolds developed paint chips using their Key 1 & Key 2 color matching system from Robert Dorr.

Caygill
Suzanne Caygill (1911–1994) was an American fashion designer and color theorist who developed the Caygill Method of Color Analysis. A milliner, poet, dress designer and night club singer, as a young adult, Caygill turned her attention to color in 1945 and devoted the rest of her life to creating individual style guides and color palettes for clients and teaching design seminars. Caygill may have been influenced by her association with Edith Head, wardrobe designer and consultant to Hollywood studios and stars.

In the 1950s, Caygill starred in a self-improvement television program on fashion and relationships, "Living With Suzanne," which aired on CBS in Los Angeles and began to teach seminars in which she described her work on style, personality, line, and color. Many devotees attended her classes, adapted and popularized her theories of personality style and color analysis in the late 1970s and 80s.

In 1980, she published Color: The Essence of You and established the Academy of Color. In this book, Caygill identified a wide range of sub-groups within each season, and gave them descriptive names such as "Early Spring", "Metallic Autumn", or "Dynamic Winter", each with its own set of special characteristics. Caygill believed in the fundamental link between style, color and a person's personality. The Suzanne Caygill Papers, circa 1950–1990, are held within the Division of Rare and Manuscript Collections, Cornell University Library, Cornell University.

Seasonal skin tone color matching for clothing and cosmetics

Starting in the 1970s, the availability of high-quality, accurate and inexpensive color printing made it possible for the first time to produce books for the mass market in which skin tones and clothing colors could be accurately reproduced. Color reproduction technology was still not perfect, causing Carole Jackson to warn her readers, "Because it is difficult to print the color swatches 100 percent accurately, ... verbal descriptions will help you understand the concept of your colors when you shop for clothes." The result was the near-simultaneous publication by a number of authors of books proposing systems of color analysis designed to allow the reader to "discover which shades of color in clothes complement your natural coloring to look healthier, sexier and more powerful."

The authors of these books all present roughly similar ideas. Most agree, for example, on the following basic points:

 Most rely upon a color system in which the colors are divided into four groups of harmonious colors which are said to match with the four seasons of the year. The seasons are, to some degree, arbitrary, and it sometimes happens that someone will be on the cusp of two seasons. But, as Carole Jackson insists, "with testing, one palette will prove to be better [more harmonious] than the other." Jackson also acknowledges, however, that the reference to the four seasons is nothing more than a convenient artifice: "We could call your coloring 'Type A,', 'Type B,' and so on, but comparison with the seasons provides a more poetic way to describe your coloring and your best colors."
 An individual's basic color category, or season, remains the same over his or her lifetime, and is not affected by tanning, because "[w]e still have the same color skin, but in a darker hue."
 Skin color, rather than hair or eye color, determines a person's season. Bernice Kentner warns, "Remember, do not rely on hair coloring to find your Season!"

Foremost publications on seasonal color analysis

Deborah Chase, The Medically Based No Nonsense Beauty Book (1975)

Chase explored the impact of skin pigments on coloration. She noted that there are three primary pigments that give the skin its tone: "Melanin, which gives the skin its brown tones; carotene imparts the yellow/orange skin tones; and hemoglobin is the red pigment in the blood, which gives the skin its pink and red hues....The three pigments--melanin, carotene, and hemoglobin join one another to produce our flesh tones."

Bernice Kentner, Color Me a Season (1978)

Bernice Kentner, who had worked as a licensed cosmetologist since 1950, began holding lectures on color analysis in the early 1970s, and in 1978 published Color Me a Season, which went through several printings in the early 1980s.

Like Chevreul and Suzanne Caygill, Kentner drew her ideas from the art of interior decorating. She wrote, "It is possible to color coordinate your home, so it is pleasing to the eye....So it is with the human body. The body itself is the background for all color that will be placed upon it. It remains our task then to find what color scheme our bodies fall into. As with the walls of a room we must determine what color our skin is." Kentner also drew on the ideas of Johannes Itten who linked the subjective colors of an individual to one of the four seasons.

Kentner emphasizes that it is skin color rather than hair or eye color that serves as the base from which a color analysis must start. The color of a person's skin determines whether that individual should be classified as a Summer, a Winter, a Spring, or an Autumn. This can cause confusion, because the color of the hair may be the first thing that strikes the observer's eye (particularly if the hair color is dramatic). Thus, "even though [one palette of] colors work best for [a particular person's] complexion, the individual may look like another Season because of haircoloring....I call this their secondary Season." The color of the hair and eyes serve to heighten the appeal of certain color choices for clothing and makeup, and to rule out certain other choices, but all such choices must be made from within the palette that is compatible with the shade of the skin.

To illustrate this point, Kentner offers the example of a woman whose dramatic hair color suggested that she ought to be an Autumn, but whose skin color made her a Winter. When the woman was "color draped" in swatches from the Winter palette, "she came to life", and looked considerably more attractive than she had been when wearing Autumn colors. However, one of the colors in the palette was incompatible with her hair, and was determined to be inappropriate for her wardrobe.

Winter
Dominant skin characteristics (an individual's skin may include more than one): "cool with rose undertones"; "may appear almost white, yet the skin will be a bit darker than the very pale-skinned 'Summer'"; "not the translucent look that a 'Summer' person has"; "Rosy cheeks will not appear naturally on a 'Winter' person"; "Dark-skinned 'Winters' are usually olive-skinned with a blue undertone."

Summer
Dominant skin characteristics (an individual's skin may include more than one): "very pale"; "It is the Summer person's lot in life to never have a suntan"; "transparent"; "fine-textured"; "light with a rosy-red or lilac undertone that does not come to the surface"; "not prone to blushing"; "The overall look of a 'Summer' is colorless".

Spring
Dominant skin characteristics (an individual's skin may include more than one): "Light amber with gold tones"; "darker suntanned look with a yellow undercast"; "There is a tendency to blush easily"; "often very rosy"; "there is a lively appearance to skin-tone"; "The overall appearance of 'Spring' is 'Radiance'".

Autumn
Dominant skin characteristics (an individual's skin may include more than one): "gold or yellow undertone"; "more gold or orange-toned than a 'Spring'"; "Bronze".

The Suzanne Caygill Method
An analyst trained in this system relies on an in-person interview which reveals a range of clues. The most important indicators are the color, light, texture and pattern found in the skin, hair and eyes. Texture, color contrast levels, movement patterns, and facial and body characteristics are secondary indicators that help to determine basic seasonal type and subgroup within the season. Experienced practitioners also often observe predictable personality types and preferences that correspond to a person's seasonal group.
 
Winter
The palette includes colors that are pure pigments, or pigments with added black, or with so much white added as to create an icy, frosted pastel.
Spring
Palette colors are usually clear washes or tints, pigments that have white or water added.
Summer
These complex palettes may have a blend of black, white, grey or brown added to their pure pigments, creating a wide range of subtle differences.
Autumn
The palette is dominated by undertones of natural brown pigment, which may range from ochre, umber, or burnt sienna to browns darkened with black.
 
With this system, almost any color can be found within each season, and many palettes include a combination of both warm and cool tones. The result is nuanced, individualized and unique to each person. The outcome of the analysis is a palette of fabric samples which complement each other and reflect the client. They can then be used as a guide to simplify selection of clothing and accessories and may also be used in choosing home and office interior colors, fabrics and designs.

Carole Jackson, Color Me Beautiful (1980)
The most successful book on seasonal color analysis was Carole Jackson's Color Me Beautiful. The book was a 1980s pop-culture phenomenon and spawned a number of related sequels, including Jackson's own Color Me Beautiful Makeup Book, and Color for Men, as well as titles in the same line by other authors. Jackson utilized a seasonal color system less complicated than Caygill's, and sought to assist each reader to find her own "thirty special colors."

Carole Jackson was the first of the "color analysis authors" to create a retail success story based on her highly successful books, selling swatch packets (a wallet designed to house fabric swatches by season) for use as a shopping companion, a successful line of cosmetics and seasonal color swatches Color Me Beautiful, and a direct selling company Color Me Direct featuring Color Analysis as its key home selling strategy. Most recently Color Me Beautiful has acquired the Color Alliance system which employs the use of color coordinates, designed to match eye color, skin tone and hair color; and through the use of computer modeling creates a unique color palette for each user.

Winter
Dominant skin tones (an individual's skin may include more than one): "Very white", "White with delicate pink tone", "Beige (no cheek color, may be sallow)", "Gray-beige or brown", "Rosy beige", "Olive", "Black" (blue undertone)", "Black (sallow)".

Summer
Dominant skin tones (an individual's skin may include more than one): "Pale beige with delicate pink cheeks", "Pale beige with no cheek color (even sallow)", "Rosy beige", "Very pink", "Gray-brown", "Rosy brown".

Spring
Dominant skin tones (an individual's skin may include more than one): "Creamy ivory", "Ivory with pale golden freckles", "Peach", "Peach/pink (may have pink/purple knuckles)", "Golden beige", "Rosy cheeks (may blush easily)", "Golden brown."

Autumn
Dominant skin tones (an individual's skin may include more than one): "Ivory", "Ivory with freckles (usually redhead)", "Peach", "Peach with freckles (usually golden blonde, brown)", "Golden beige (no cheek color, needs blush)", "dark beige, coppery", "Golden brown."

Mary Spillane and Christine Sherlock, Color Me Beautiful's Looking Your Best
Spillane and Sherlock introduced an expanded classification system, in which the four "seasonal" palettes were expanded to twelve.

Veronique Henderson and Pat Henshaw
Henderson and Henshaw combine the seasonal analysis method with a classification system based on contrasts in an individual's coloring, returning to the previous color study from Doris Pooser in the early 1990s.

Other Color Analysis Systems 
Seasonal color analysis is not the only color analysis system out there. Other color systems base their methodology on Munsell's color system of chroma, temperature and hue.

Systems of contrast analysis 
In an attempt to move away from the complexities involved in seasonal color systems, some authors have suggested that it is possible to achieve attractive results by focusing instead on the level of contrast between a person's skin tone and his or her hair and eye colors.

Donna Cognac, Essential Colors
The principles of repeating one's contrast level as well as the color temperatures and intensities that complement their personal coloring are combined in a system developed by Donna Cognac. It relates 16 different color harmonies to the energy of nature's five elements: Water, Wood, Fire, Earth, and Metal. Palettes are various combinations of these five elemental energies. For example, any palette with a very bright appearance or a very warm overall color temperature is a Fire palette to one degree or another and is consistent with the essence of the wearer.

Joanne Nicholson and Judy Lewis-Crum, Color Wonderful (1986)
Another method of analysis was developed by color consultants Joanne Nicholson and Judy Lewis-Crum, whose 1986 book Color Wonderful  explains their classification system, which is based on the amount of contrast in an individual's coloring.

Alan Flusser, Dressing the Man (2002)
Flusser lays out two relatively simple rules:
The degree of contrast between the wearer's skin and his / her hair and eyes should be reflected in the degree of contrast between the colors in his / her clothes. "[The] great variety of shadings ... can be scaled down into two basic formats: contrast or muted. If your hair is dark and your skin light, you have a contrast format. If your hair and skin tone are similar, your complexion would be considered muted or tonal." A high-contrast individual should dress in clothes with highly contrasting colors. The result will be that the "high-contrast format [of the clothing] actually invites the eye to look at [the wearer's] face because of its compatibility with his [dark] hair and light skin." By contrast, "Encasing a low-intensity complexion within a higher-contrast setting dilutes the face's natural pigmentation in addition to distracting the viewer's eye."
One or more of the tones in the skin and hair should be repeated in an article of clothing near the face. One option is to repeat the color of the hair in a jacket, tie or scarf, in order to "frame" the face: "The obvious choice of suit shade would be that which repeated his hair color, thereby drawing the observer's attention to what was bracketed in between--in other words, his face." Flusser uses a series of photos of models to demonstrate that it is possible to achieve attractive results by repeating the eye color or the skin tones in clothing articles that are close to the face, and that it is even more desirable to use several colors in the clothes to match some combination of skin / hair / eye colors.

Color psychology

Color psychology, an extension of color analysis, is a valuable tool that is used in conjunction with the analysis of colors. In reality, the psychological connotation of a color has nothing to do with its effect upon the color of one's face or the results in the mirror. It is necessary to consider both the physical impact color has upon your appearance, and the impact a color has upon the unique persona that one projects to the world.

Color seasons

Spring
Spring colors are clear and bright, just like the colors of a spring day. The sun is low on the horizon, so everything is imbued with the golden hues of the sun. The trees and grass have not yet matured, so they are tinged with yellow undertones and are a bright spring green color. Distinct yellow undertones impart a vibrant, electric appearance to everything. The colors of this season are truly like a spring bouquet of flowers enveloped in bright spring green leafy foliage: red-orange and coral tulips, bright yellow jonquils and daffodils.

Summer
The colors of this season are muted with blue undertones (think of looking at the scenery through a dusky summer haze). Late summer blossoms, a frothy ocean and white beaches are seen everywhere. Baby blue, slate blue, periwinkle, powder pink, seafoam green and slate grey are typical Summer colors.

Autumn
Autumn colors are virtually indistinguishable from the rich, earthy colors of the season for which they were named. They are as golden-hued as a fall day, and it is impossible to mistake them for any other season. Typical colors from the palette include pumpkin, mustard yellow, burnt orange, brown, camel, beige, avocado green, rust and teal. Autumn colors are perennially popular, because they bring a feeling of warmth and security. The painting by Millais personifies the color of autumn.

Winter
The colors from this season are clear and icy, like a winter's day; always with subtle blue undertones. To name a few: hollyberry red, emerald and evergreen, royal blue, magenta and violet. Winter inspires pictures of winter berries, pine green conifers and black and white huskies racing through snow.

See also 
 Color-blocking

References 

Fashion
Analysis
Color of clothing